Portrait of Humphry Morice is a 1761–62 oil on canvas painting by the Italian artist Pompeo Batoni showing the Englishman Humphry Morice. It is now in a private collection, although it is on display in the National Gallery, London. A signed 1762 autograph copy of the work entered the collection of Sir James and Lady Graham at Norton Conyers and is now on display at Basildon Park as part of National Trust collection.

Morice made three trips to Italy on business and was one of Batoni's main patrons. The painting was produced on the second trip - Morice is shown resting in the countryside with three whippets after a hunt. In the background are the Torre Leonina and the Torre dei Venti.

References

1762 paintings
Portraits by Pompeo Batoni